Wayne Ehlers (born 1938) is an American former politician in the state of Washington. He was the Washington state Representative for the 2nd district from 1975 to 1979. He was also Speaker of the Washington state House from 1983 to 1987.

References

Living people
1938 births
Politicians from Bellingham, Washington
Democratic Party members of the Washington House of Representatives